A Mero Hajur 3 is a Nepali romantic comedy-drama film, directed by Jharana Thapa (her second film as a director) and produced by Sunil Kumar Thapa, under the banner of Suhana Entertainment and Sunil Kumar Thapa Production. The film stars Suhana Thapa in her debut and Anmol K.C.  in the lead roles alongside Salon Basnet, Arpan Thapa and Rabindra Jha.

The film is part of the A Mero Hajur series after A Mero Hajur 2 (2017) and A Mero Hajur (2002). The film was released on 12 April 2019. The film received mix response while its routine story was criticised but received positive response for performances esp. debutant Suhana Thapa, films chartbuster music, cinematography and coustume design . The film was a commercial blockbuster as it became the 6th Highest Grossing Nepali film in Nepal and the highest grossing film in Anmol K.C.'s career.

Plot 
Arya, a simple modern girl, is a big fan of singer Prem. Prem who is a singing sensation is tired of his life wants to live a normal life free of work load and stardom behind of him. So, with the help of his friend Hari he transforms himself to Ghanshyam Maharjan. Prem meets Arya after various encounters and gradually Prem starts to love her. But he mostly spends most of her time as Ghanshyam Maharjan whom she meets at an event where all people think him as Prem. Then he, proposes her revealing his identity that Ghanshyam and Prem are the same.

Arya rejects him making excuses of bet with her friend. Prem becomes heartbroken. He thinks that she only played with him to win the bet. Prem is sponsored by Suprim who takes care of Prem and is strict to him who also hates his bond with a fan. After he learns that they are no longer in touch after that bet issue he becomes happy.

Later, Prem learns that Arya is suffering from cancer and is dying. This was why she rejected her proposal as she cannot bear that she could not be together with the man whom she loves most on this planet. At last moment of Arya, she says that they share a special bond, and Arya promises she will come in next birth just for Prem. Prem is interviewed by a reporter where he shares his story. The film ends on a sad note.

Cast 

 Anmol KC as Prem and Ghanshyam Maharjan
 Suhana Thapa as Arya
 Salon Basnet as Hari
 Arpan Thapa as Supreme (Career Advisor of Prem)
 Rabindra Jha

Production

Cast 
Samragyee RL Shah, Salinman Bania and Salon Basnet were ousted from the film due to shooting schedule but later Salon Basnet came back to film. Than Pradeep Khadka was considered to play the lead role but later dropped out of the film. Then later Anmol K.C. signed the film with 30 lakhs to 40 lakhs Nepalese rupees making him the most expensive actor in Nepal beating his contemporary Pradeep Khadka and Paul Shah. Then Jharana Thapa signed her daughter to play the lead actress Suhana Thapa.

Production 
The film began shooting the film in Pokhara, Nepal on September. Release date of the film was announced before film went in production. The first look of the film was released in October 2018. The film widely demanded by the Nepalese audience after the release of the A Mero Hajur 2.

The film is Suhana Thapa's debut film.

Soundtrack

References

External links 

 

2019 films
2019 romantic comedy-drama films
Nepalese romantic comedy films
Films set in Nepal
Films directed by Jharana Thapa
Nepalese sequel films
2019 comedy-drama films
Films shot in Pokhara